WKVV (101.7 FM) is a radio station licensed to Searsport, Maine, United States. Established in 1994 as WBYA, the station serves the Bangor area.  The stations is owned by the Educational Media Foundation. The station carries Educational Media Foundation's K-LOVE Christian music format, simulcasting co-owned WKVZ.

History 
Prior to simulcasting K-LOVE, the station was an oldies station simulcasting co-owned WGUY and a modern rock station, owned by Clear Channel Broadcasting. Over Clear Channel's nearly 7 years of ownership the station shifted from classic rock to modern rock, all while carrying the syndicated Bob & Tom Show. Previous to Clear Channel's ownership, the station was owned by Moonsong Communications, owners of WVOM where it was an Adult Alternative Rock station and simulcasted WVOM for a time. During the 1990s it known as "The Wave" and with the call letters WBYA (no relation to the current WBYA 105.5 in Camden, Maine) simulcasting the classical music of WAVX in Thomaston (now WBQX). From 2001 to 2003 and 2004-2006 WFZX was simulcasted on 97.7 WNSX Winter Harbor. From January 2001 to August 2006 the station primarily focused on Classic rock artists such as The Eagles, The Beatles and The Rolling Stones. In September 2006, a shift in programming occurred, playing newer acts such as Nickelback, Three Doors Down, Buckcherry and Red Hot Chili Peppers and still playing harder edged classic rock artists like Aerosmith. A year later, the station would dump the general rock format for Bangor's first modern rock station since the demise of 97X in the 1990s (Now country music WBFB). The station also carried New England Patriots football from 2002 to 2005 and NASCAR racing from Motor Racing Network. The station would carry the modern rock format until Clear Channel Communications sold their entire Maine group to Blueberry Broadcasting. Because of ownership limits in the Bangor market, WGUY and WFZX were to be sold off, carrying an oldies format from September 2008 to February 2009 before adopting the current K-LOVE format.

References

External links

Contemporary Christian radio stations in the United States
Radio stations established in 1995
K-Love radio stations
Waldo County, Maine
1995 establishments in Maine
Educational Media Foundation radio stations
KVV